is a Fuji Television female announcer.

Biography
Yuka was born in Tokyo. She graduated from Tokyo Gakugei University International Secondary School and Gakushuin University Faculty of Literature, English and American culture.

In April 2017, she joined Fuji Television as an announcer, joining with Koki Adake, Akiko Kuji, and Shoui Kurose.

From October 2017 until March 2018, she served as MC Assistant for Tokudane!

Personal life
Yuka has been interested in international affairs since she was young and has had the experience of studying abroad in three countries.

She received an award at the Model United Nations All-Japan Competition at the time of her third grade high school. During college, she belonged to the "Model United Nations Hiyoshi Study Group," which is active mainly at Keio University, and was mainly studying the agenda items handled by the United Nations Security Council. In high school she belonged to the volleyball club and served as a captain.

Current appearance programmes
Pro Yakyū News (28 Mar 2021 – present, Fuji TV One)
FNN Live News α (8 Apr 2022 – present) - Sports anchor

Former appearances
Downtown Now (9 Jun 2017)
Flag7 (Houdou Kyoku, 20 Jun – 29 Aug 2017) - Tuesday announcer
Yoru no Announcer Kenshū (6–30 Jun 2017)
Tokudane! (CX, 2 Oct 2017 – 30 Mar 2018) - MC Assistant
Prime News Evening (2 Apr 2018 – 29 Mar 2019) - Co-anchor
Go! Go! Chuggington (4 Feb 2018 – 5 May 2019) - 6th navigator
Live News it! (1 Apr 2019 – 25 Sep 2020) - Field reporter
attest ~Weekly Golf News~ (5 Oct 2020 – 28 Mar 2022, BS Fuji)

References

External links
 
 
 

Japanese announcers
Gakushuin University alumni
People from Tokyo
1994 births
Living people